Chrysothrix is a genus of lichen-forming fungi in the family Chrysothricaceae. They are commonly called gold dust lichens or sulfur dust lichens, because they are bright yellow to greenish-yellow, sometimes flecked with orange, and composed entirely of powdery soredia.  Apothecia are never present in North American specimens.

They grow on bark or rocks, generally in shaded habitats.  They can sometimes be mistaken for sterile specimens of Chaenotheca, which usually has pinhead apothecia on tiny stalks, or Psilolechia, which usually has small, bright yellow apothecia.  Chrysothrix chlorina was traditionally used as a brown dye for wool in Scandinavia.

Taxonomy
The genus was circumscribed by French botanist Camille Montagne in 1852, with Chrysothrix noli-tangere assigned as the type species.

Species
Chrysothrix bergeri  – southeastern United States; the Caribbean; Bermuda
Chrysothrix caesia 
Chrysothrix candelaris 
Chrysothrix chamaecyparicola  – eastern North America
Chrysothrix chilensis  – Chile
Chrysothrix chlorina 
Chrysothrix chrysophthalma 
Chrysothrix citrinella 
Chrysothrix flavovirens 
Chrysothrix frischii 
Chrysothrix galapagoana 
Chrysothrix granulosa  – South America
Chrysothrix insulizans 
Chrysothrix noli-tangere 
Chrysothrix occidentalis  – Australia
Chrysothrix oceanica 
Chrysothrix onokoensis 
Chrysothrix palaeophila  – Australia
Chrysothrix pavonii 
Chrysothrix placodioides  – South America
Chrysothrix septemseptata  – India
Chrysothrix susquehannensis  – eastern North America
Chrysothrix tchupalensis  – Australia
Chrysothrix xanthina

References

 
Lichen genera
Taxa described in 1852
Taxa named by Camille Montagne
Arthoniomycetes genera